Amy Frazier and Elna Reinach were the defending champions, but Frazier did not compete this year. Reinach teamed up with Elizabeth Smylie and lost in the semifinals to Lindsay Davenport and Marianne Werdel.

Mary Joe Fernández and Helena Suková won the title by defeating Davenport and Werdel 6–2, 6–4 in the final.

Seeds

Draw

Draw

References

External links
 Official results archive (ITF)
 Official results archive (WTA)

WTA Swiss Open
European Open - Doubles